Manjula Tulshiram Gavit is a politician from Dhule district, Maharashtra. She is current Member of Maharashtra Legislative Assembly from  Sakri Vidhan Sabha constituency  as an independent member. 
After elected she joined Shiv Sena in Presence of Udhav Thackeray.

Positions held
 2019: Re-Elected to Maharashtra Legislative Assembly

References

External links
  Shivsena Home Page 

1963 births
Living people
People from Dhule district
Maharashtra MLAs 2019–2024
Bharatiya Janata Party politicians from Maharashtra